Kronenberg may refer to:

Cronenberg, Wuppertal, in North Rhine-Westphalia, Germany
Kronenberg, Netherlands, in Limburg
Kronenberg (surname)

See also 
 Cronenberg (disambiguation)
 Kronenburg (disambiguation)
 Kronenbourg Brewery